Richard Henry Meade (1814 – 23 December 1899 in Bradford, England) was an English surgeon, and Justice of the peace. But is more noted as an entomologist who specialised in Diptera - most notably the family Muscidae and also in Spiders.

Works
partial list
Meade, R. H., (1878) Notes on the Anthomyiidae of North America. Entomologist's Monthly Magazine, XIV 250-252
Meade, R.H. (1882) Annotated List of British Anthomyiidae. Entomologists’ Monthly Magazine, Vol.xviii, 201-205.
Meade, R.H. (1887) "Supplement to annotated list of British Anthomyiidae.Entomologist's Monthly Magazine 23: 179-181, 250-253, 24: 54-58, 73-76. 
Meade R.H. (1891) Additions to the list of British Anthomyiidae. Entomologist's Monthly Magazine. 1891:27(2):42–43.

References

Dipterists
British arachnologists
1814 births
1899 deaths
British entomologists